Elwyn Brook-Jones (11 December 1911 – 4 September 1962) was a British theatre, film and television actor.

Life
Brook-Jones was born in Kuching, Sarawak, on the island of Borneo. After a private education, he attended Jesus College, Oxford.

His public debut was in Australia, aged 11, as a concert pianist; he later made cabaret appearances in the US and the Far East.  He was a repertory actor, first appearing in London in 1943 in Hedda Gabler as Judge Brack, before going on to appear in many productions in the West End, films and television.

In the BBC children's series Garry Halliday, he was the hero's opponent "The Voice". His most prominent film role was arguably Tober in Carol Reed's Odd Man Out (1947). He was also Gladwin in Michael Powell and Emeric Pressburger's The Small Back Room (1949) and the Emir in The Pure Hell of St Trinian's (1960).

He died in Reading, Berkshire, aged 50.

Selected filmography
 Odd Man Out (1947)
 The Three Weird Sisters (1948)
 Good-Time Girl (1948)
 Bonnie Prince Charlie (1948)
 It's Hard to Be Good (1948)
 Dear Mr. Prohack (1949)
 The Wonder Kid (1950)
 I'll Get You for This (1951)
 Life in Her Hands (1951)
 Judgment Deferred (1952)
 The Night Won't Talk (1952) as Martin Soames
 Three Steps in the Dark (1953)
 The Harassed Hero (1954) as Logan (credited as Elwyn Brook Jones)
 Beau Brummell (1954) as Mr. Tupp (uncredited)
 The Gilded Cage (1955)
 Assignment Redhead (1956)
   Rogue's Yarn (1957) as Inspector Walker
 The Duke Wore Jeans (1958)
 Passport to Shame (1958)
 The Four Just Men (TV series)
(The Deadly Capsule) (1959) as Mr Scheye
 Dial 999 (TV series) ('Ghost Squad', episode) (1959) as Mr. Scott
 The Ugly Duckling (1959)

References

External links

1911 births
1962 deaths
Alumni of Jesus College, Oxford
British male television actors
British male film actors
British male stage actors
British classical pianists
20th-century British male actors
20th-century British pianists
20th-century British musicians
People from Kuching
Raj of Sarawak people